This is the List of churches in Estonia. It aims to include all current churches, chapels and monasteries in the current territory of Estonia, as well as former Christian sacral buildings that were specially designed for that purpose. The list may not include all smaller chapels located within churchyards and cemeteries, as well as regular buildings formerly used by a congregation. Note that the "Year" here denotes the year that the construction of the church began or finished, when it was inaugurated, or the main construction period of the church in question.

In line with the common church naming traditions in Estonia, a traditionally Lutheran country, the Lutheran parish churches are usually listed by their locality name (e.g. "Aegviidu Church"), while churches of other denominations are listed either by their full name by their common name. If a locality has several Lutheran churches, the official names are given.

Churches in Estonia

Harju County

Hiiu County

Ida-Viru County

Jõgeva County

Järva County

Lääne County

Lääne-Viru County

Pärnu County

Põlva County

Rapla County

Saare County

Tartu County

Valga County

Viljandi County

Võru County

References

Chuches
Estonia